Pavarolo is a comune (municipality) in the Metropolitan City of Turin in the Italian region Piedmont, located about  east of Turin. 
Pavarolo borders the following municipalities: Gassino Torinese, Castiglione Torinese, Baldissero Torinese, Montaldo Torinese, and Chieri.

Twin towns — sister cities
Pavarolo is twinned with:

  Le Cheylas, France, since 1995

References

Cities and towns in Piedmont